Minhyong Kim is a South Korean mathematician who specialises in arithmetic geometry and anabelian geometry.

Biography
Kim received his PhD at Yale University in 1990 under the supervision of Serge Lang and Barry Mazur, going on to work in a number of universities, including M.I.T., Columbia, Arizona, Purdue, the Korea Institute for Advanced Study, UCL (University College London) and the University of Oxford. He is currently the Christopher Zeeman Professor of Algebra, Geometry, and Public Understanding of Mathematics at University of Warwick.

Research
Kim has made contributions to the application of arithmetic homotopy theory to the study of Diophantine problems, especially to finiteness theorems of the Faltings–Siegel type.

His work was featured in 2017 in the Quanta Magazine, where he described his work as being inspired by physics.

Awards
In 2012, Minhyong Kim received the Ho-Am Prize for Science, with the Ho-Am committee citing him as "one of the leading researchers in the area of arithmetic algebraic geometry".

Education
1982 - 1985 B.S. Department of Mathematics, Seoul National University
1985 - 1990 Ph.D. Department of Mathematics, Yale University

Work
1990 – 1993   C. L. E. Moore Instructor, Massachusetts Institute of Technology
1993 – 1996   J.F. Ritt Assistant Professor, Columbia University
1995 – 2007   Assistant Professor, Associate Professor, and Professor, University of Arizona
2001 – 2002   Professor, Korea Institute for Advanced Study
2005 – 2007   Professor, Purdue University
2007 – 2011   Chair of Pure Mathematics, University College London
2010 – 2013   Yun San Chair Professor, Pohang University of Science and Technology
2011 – 2020   Professor of Number Theory and Fellow of Merton College, University of Oxford
2013 – Present   Invited Chair Professor, Seoul National University
2020 - Present   Christopher Zeeman Professor of Algebra, Geometry, and Public Understanding of Mathematics, University of Warwick

Grants and awards

1991 - 1993   NSF grant DMS-9106444
1997 - 2001  NSF grant DMS-9701489 : ‘Effective Diophantine Geometry over Function Fields’.
1998 - 2002 NSF Group Infrastructure Grant : ‘Southwestern Center for Arithmetic Geometry’, Co-PI with six other researchers from the University of Arizona, UTexas Austin, USC, and the University of New Mexico.
2003 - 2006  NSF Infrastructure grant : ‘Southwestern Center for Arithmetic Geometry’, Co-PI with nine other researchers from the University of Arizona, UTexas Austin, USC, UC Berkeley, and the University of New Mexico.
2005 - 2008  NSF grant DMS-0500504 : ‘Motivic fundamental groups, multiple polylogarithms, and Diophantine geometry’.
2006 - 2008  Japan Society for the Promotion of Science, Core-to-Core program ‘New Developments of Arithmetic Geometry, Motive, Galois Theory, and Their Practical Applications,’ Foreign member
2008        EPSRC grant, 46437, for workshop ‘Non-commutative constructions in arithmetic and geometry’
2009        EPSRC grant, EP/G024979/1, 3-year project on ‘Non-commutative fundamental groups in Diophantine geometry’, March
2012        Ho-Am Prize in Science

Publications
 "p-adic L-functions and Selmer varieties associated to elliptic curves with complex multiplication", Annals of Mathematics
 "The motivic fundamental group of P1∖{0,1,∞} and the theorem of Siegel", Inventiones Mathematicae
 "Massey products for elliptic curves of rank 1", Journal of the American Mathematical Society
 "Selmer varieties for curves with CM Jacobians" (with John H. Coates)

References

 Professor Kim's University of Warwick profile page
 

1963 births
Living people
Academics of University College London
Columbia University faculty
Fellows of Merton College, Oxford
Massachusetts Institute of Technology faculty
Academic staff of Pohang University of Science and Technology
Purdue University faculty
Recipients of the Ho-Am Prize in Science
Seoul National University alumni
Academic staff of Seoul National University
21st-century South Korean mathematicians
South Korean expatriates in the United Kingdom
South Korean expatriates in the United States
University of Arizona faculty
Yale University alumni
Arithmetic geometers
20th-century South Korean mathematicians